Alfred Noble may refer to:

 Alfred Noble (engineer) (1844–1914), American civil engineer
 Alfred H. Noble (1894–1983), American Marine Corps general
 Alfred Noble (footballer) (1924–1999), English footballer

See also
 Monty Noble (Montague Alfred Noble, 1873–1940), Australian cricketer